Maksim Vladimirovich Fokin (born 27 June 1982) is a former Russian professional footballer.

Club career
He made his debut for FC Torpedo Moscow on 1 April 2003 in a Russian Premier League Cup game against FC Dynamo Moscow, and appeared in 2 more games in the tournament.

He played 3 seasons in the Russian Football National League for FC KAMAZ Naberezhnye Chelny and FC Fakel Voronezh.

See also
Football in Russia

References

1982 births
Footballers from Moscow
Living people
Russian footballers
Association football midfielders
FC Torpedo Moscow players
FC Torpedo-2 players
FC Tobol players
FC KAMAZ Naberezhnye Chelny players
FC Fakel Voronezh players
FC Aktobe players
FC Kairat players
Kazakhstan Premier League players
Russian expatriate footballers
Expatriate footballers in Kazakhstan
Russian expatriate sportspeople in Kazakhstan